WTAY (1570 AM) is a radio station broadcasting a news/talk/sports/classic hits format. Licensed to Robinson, Illinois, United States, the station is owned by The Original Company, Inc.

Translators
In addition to the main station, WTAY is relayed by a translator on 94.3 MHz FM.

References

External links
WTAY website

TAY
News and talk radio stations in the United States